Synodus orientalis is a species of lizardfish that lives mainly in the Northwest Pacific Ocean.

Description 
This species can reach the average length of about 23.4 cm (9.2 in) as an unsexed male.

Distribution and habitat 
Synodus orientalis can be found in a marine environment within a benthopelagic range. Their depth range is anywhere between 2 and 32 meters. They are native to a tropical climate in areas of Asia, such as Japan and Taiwan.

References

Notes 

 

Synodontidae
Fish described in 2008